Founded in 1993 by ex-Microsoft development manager David Snipp Stardraw is a company that makes audio/visual system integration and design software.

Software

Stardraw has two different but related sets of software both for the Audio-visual (A/V) market

Computer aided design

Stardraw's design software is for creating documentation of audio/visual systems.  This includes A/V schematics (similar to a Computer network diagram), Rack Layouts, Presentation Drawings (Pictorial Schematics), Panel Layouts for custom metalwork, Plan View drawings, and associated reports such as Bills of Materials, Quotations and Cable Schedules.

The software includes preset equipment icons to make it quick to create an illustrations of a A/V system design.

Their software of this type includes

Stardraw Audio 2007 (Discontinued)
Stardraw A/V 2007 (Discontinued)
Stardraw A/V Lite 2007 (Discontinued)
Stardraw Lighting 2D 2007 (Discontinued)
Stardraw Design 7 - Released June 2011

Control Software

Stardraw control is their Integrated development environment for creating Touchscreen remote control of a wide variety of equipment.

Typical uses include room automation in boardrooms, auditoriums, museums or home theaters, where users use fixed and wireless touch-screens to control devices such as video projectors and displays, PCs, DVD and VCR players and recorders, cameras, teleconferencing systems, audio/video switchers and processing equipment, motorized projection screens, drapes, lighting, HVAC systems, and a wide variety of other types of equipment. Other common uses include entertainment systems, industrial command and control centers, security systems, hotels and restaurants.

What separates their software from rivals AMX and Crestron is that it does not require any special hardware instead it runs on any machine running Microsoft Windows, further more the drivers and scripts for it are written in the general programming language C# rather than a proprietary language and designed in a graphical environment similar to that used by Microsoft's programming languages.

The software also present a Web service interface which enables non-windows devices to control the software for example Tablet computers such as Apples iPad

See also
List of CAD companies
AMX 
AutoCAD
AVSnap

References
Sound & Communications Magazine - 20 Years with Stardraw.com

External links
Stardraw homepage

1995 software
Home automation
Building automation
Remote control